Rasnik Peak is the sharp, partly ice-covered peak rising to 1066 m at the southwest extremity of Chiren Heights on Velingrad Peninsula, Graham Coast in Graham Land, Antarctica.  It has steep and partly ice-free northwest and southeast slopes, and surmounts Hugi Glacier and its tributary Caulfield Glacier to the south, and Holtedahl Bay to the west.

The peak is named after the settlement of Rasnik in Western Bulgaria.

Location
British mapping in 1976.

Maps
 Antarctic Digital Database (ADD). Scale 1:250000 topographic map of Antarctica. Scientific Committee on Antarctic Research (SCAR). Since 1993, regularly upgraded and updated.
British Antarctic Territory. Scale 1:200000 topographic map. DOS 610 Series, Sheet W 66 64. Directorate of Overseas Surveys, Tolworth, UK, 1976.

Notes

References
 Bulgarian Antarctic Gazetteer. Antarctic Place-names Commission. (details in Bulgarian, basic data in English)
Rasnik Peak. SCAR Composite Antarctic Gazetteer.

External links
 Rasnik Peak. Copernix satellite image

Mountains of Graham Land
Bulgaria and the Antarctic
Graham Coast